Carysfort can refer to:

 Carysfort, County Wicklow former borough now called Macreddin
 Carysfort (Parliament of Ireland constituency)
 Earl of Carysfort, and Baron Carysfort, Irish peerage of the Proby family
 Carysfort Reef, Florida Keys
 Carysfort Reef Light
 Cape Carysfort, East Falkland island
 HMS Carysfort, five ships of the Royal Navy
 Carysfort College former teacher training college in Dublin